Destination Moon is the fourth album by Canadian R&B singer Deborah Cox. It was released by Decca Records on June 4, 2007 in the United States. A tribute album to jazz singer Dinah Washington, Cox noted it "a concept album that I've had in mind for years". Many of Washington's songs are reinterpreted on the album including the title track "Destination Moon". Most of the album was recorded live with a forty-piece orchestra and was produced and arranged by Rob Mounsey. The week after its release, Destination Moon peaked at number three on the Billboard Top Jazz Albums.

Track listing
Credits adapted from the liner notes of Destination Moon.

Charts

References

2007 albums
Concept albums
Covers albums
Deborah Cox albums
Decca Records albums
Dinah Washington tribute albums
Jazz albums by Canadian artists